The white-winged magpie or Hainan magpie (Urocissa whiteheadi) is a passerine bird of the crow family, Corvidae. It is unusual among the members of its genus in that it is black and white, lacking the blue plumage other Urocissa magpies have. Thus, it is sometimes placed in its own monotypic genus, Cissopica, though it appears to have sufficient features to remain in the genus Urocissa. There are two subspecies, the nominate whiteheadi being found in Hainan and xanthomelana found in southern China, northern Vietnam, and north and central Laos. The two subspecies are distinctive and may merit specific status; further research is needed.

The binomial commemorates the British explorer John Whitehead.

References

External links
 Urocissa whiteheadi at the Internet Bird Collection

white-winged magpie
Birds of South China
Birds of Laos
Birds of Vietnam
Birds of Yunnan
white-winged magpie
white-winged magpie